Willem Dreeslaan is a RandstadRail station in Zoetermeer, the Netherlands.

History

The station opened on 29 October 2006, as part of the Oosterheemlijn (Seghwaert - Javalaan). The station is on a viaduct along the Aletta Jacobslaan at the junction with Willem Dreeslaan.

Train services
The following services currently call at Willem Dreeslaan:

Bus services
 165 (Centrum West RR - Palenstein RR - Willem Dreeslaan RR - Benthuizen - Hazerwoude - Hazerwoude Rijndijk - Alphen a/d Rijn NS) - Arriva
 565 (Centrum West RR - Palenstein RR - Willem Dreeslaan RR - Benthuizen - Hazerwoude - Hazerwoude Rijndijk - Alphen a/d Rijn NS) - Arriva

Gallery

RandstadRail stations in Zoetermeer
Railway stations opened in 2006